Zombie Reddy is a 2021 Indian Telugu-language action zombie comedy film directed by Prasanth Varma, and stars Teja Sajja, Anandhi, and Daksha Nagarkar. Produced by Apple Trees Studios, the film is marketed as the first zombie film in Telugu cinema. Set in the district of Kurnool, the film is partially based on COVID-19 pandemic. The film was released on 5 February 2021.

Plot 

Mario is a game designer from Hyderabad, but his father berates him for being a gamer and tells him to get a real job. Mario develops a game along with his friends Bhadram and Maggie which becomes famous overnight but they detect a bug that causes the game to crash at higher levels. A frustrated Mario calls his friend, Kalyan, also the programmer but Kalyan tells them that he is getting married. He invites them to Kurnool district for his wedding, promising to fix the code.

Kalyan's father-in-law Bhooma Reddy is a chieftain who rules the village of Rudravaram. However, he hides all weapons from Kalyan with the help of his ​men Kasi Reddy and Masi Reddy, until Kalyan is married off to his daughter, Pushkala. Meanwhile, Nandini Reddy, the daughter of Bhooma's close aid Bukka Reddy, also arrives at the wedding. As Mario and his friends drive to Rudravaram, they accidentally hit a man on the road who later bites Bhadram. An old man immediately arrives and takes him away, claiming that the man is an escaped mental patient. The trio continues on their way and asks for directions to Bhooma Reddy's house. Aagam Reddy misleads them by taking them to Veera Reddy, Bhooma's arch-rival. Veera commands his men to attack them but the three of them escape. Mario warns Kalyan about Veera but Nandini lies that Veera was playing a prank on them. This allays everyone's fears, but Mario remains suspicious. Mario overhears many of the villagers discussing the fate of Kalyan would be like a Veera's sacrificial goat. Despite multiple warnings, Kalyan doesn't believe Mario.

Meanwhile, Bhadram's condition begins to worsen as he transforms into a zombie. He bites a household maid, who in turn bites a laborer, spreading the zombie virus, even further. Mario, on the other hand, is suspicious of Nandini but Mario is caught red-handed as he accidentally films when Nandini was changing her dress. Bhooma forgives Mario with a warning and an upset Kalyan accuses Mario of sabotaging his wedding. Kalyan gives him the fixed code and asks him to leave but Mario asks for forgiveness, and the two playfully prank each other. Mario puts sleeping pills in Kalyan's drink to kidnap and save him from Veera Reddy. Nandini, however, silently switches the drink, and Mario is knocked unconscious, stashed away in a storeroom.

The wedding takes place as planned but the virus has spread to Pushkala, the bride. On the wedding night, a zombie Pushkala attempts to bite Kalyan, but he misinterprets it as playfulness. As the virus has spread to the village, Bhooma and his men go to the village to investigate. Mario wakes from his stupor and witnesses Veera's men kidnapping Kalyan. Mario finds Nandini and the two begin to quarrel until they both witness a zombie attack on one of Bhooma's workers. As the entire household has succumbed and become zombies, they lock themselves in the house along with Maggie and Kasi Reddy. In order to escape, they put makeup on themselves so that they resemble zombies. Mario also realizes that the zombies have an advanced sense of smell, so he pours kerosene on himself, When the zombies surrounding the house are distracted by a drunken Masi Reddy, Mario gets to the car and they all escape.

Mario drives them to Veera Reddy's house to save Kalyan. Maggie and Masi stay in the car, while Mario, Kasi, and Nandini go look for Kalyan. Mario and Kasi come upon Konda Reddy, Veera's bedridden father. They avoid being captured by hiding in the wardrobe. As they free up Kalyan and are about to leave, they find a woman bound and gagged who reveals herself as the real Nandini Reddy who was captured by Veera on her way to the wedding. The woman who has been as masquerading as Nandini is Sailaja Reddy, Veera's daughter, who was sent as a spy to Bhooma's house.

Mario and others are captured and Veera reveals that he was for vying vengeance on Bhooma whose younger brother was engaged to Veera's sister Talambari, 25 years ago. As Bhooma's brother eloped just before the wedding, Talambari went mad. As Veera plans to get his vengeance by killing Kalyan and making Bhooma's daughter a widow, Mario intervenes and says that Veera should be taking revenge not on Kalyan, but on Bhooma's eloped brother. A portrait reveals he is Pratap Reddy, Mario's father. Mario pretends to take Talambari hostage and escapes with Kalyan, Maggie, and Masi. Veera, Sailaja, and their men pursue Mario into the village but the village erupts into chaos as zombies begin attacking the villagers. Veera's men are bitten by Konda, who has turned into a zombie. During the scuffle, a mob of zombies swarms and attack Veera. Filled with grief, Shailaja joins forces with Mario, Maggie, and Kasi and begins fighting the zombies. They discover that the only way to kill the zombies is by damaging their brains. The zombies chase Kasi up a palm tree. A horde of zombies led by a zombified Bhadram attacks Maggie who is turned into a zombie.

Mario, Sailaja, and Kalyan flee once again. Mario deduces that the old man who took away the man who bit Bhadram in the woods would knew something about the crisis. Following a path in the woods, they reach the old man's house and find the original zombie, trapped in a glass cage along with the hidden lab. They confront the old man and demand the truth. He reveals that he was once a world-famous virologist but the government banned him, citing his practices as unethical and inhumane. Desperate to recover his former reputation, he began developing a cure for the coronavirus and tested it directly on humans. The zombie virus came from a failed vaccine. The old man claims that he has found a cure for both viruses and gives Mario a video camera. Before he can tell them about the cure, the caged zombie breaks free and begins attacking the old man. The trio escape and are picked up by Bhooma. Mario goes over the footage in the video camera and finds a symbol from the village's temple.

On their way to the temple, Sailaja is scratched by a zombie. She asks Mario to leave her behind, but Mario takes her into the temple and bars the doors. While searching for the symbol, they come upon Veera. When a joyful Sailaja runs to her father, an angry Bhooma confronts Veera for plotting against him. Veer accuses him of the same, saying that he secretly brought his brother's son to the wedding. Bhooma is shocked to know that Mario is Pratap's son and says that Pratap disgraced him and the family by leaving a girl at the altar. Mario admits what his father did was wrong but also confronts Bhooma and Veera on their mistakes. Bhooma and Veera realize their mistake and join hands to hold off the zombie while the others continue looking for the symbol.

Sailaja now turns into a zombie and attacks Mario. Mario pushes Sailaja and falls at the base of the Shiva lingam as the water from the spring falls into her mouth. An amazed Mario watches as the water begins to heal Sailaja, and she reverts to her normal self. Mario blows a conch, summoning all the zombies in the nearby countryside to the temple. As the zombies chase him, Mario jumps into the spring-fed pond. As the zombies follow him into the water, they are cured. Mario is hailed as a hero for stopping the virus as both the families, along with a cured Maggie and Bhadram joyfully re-unite.

Cast 

 Teja Sajja as Marripalem Obul Reddy a.k.a. Mario.
 Anandhi as Sailaja/ Nandini 
 Daksha Nagarkar as Maggie
 RJ Hemanth as Kalyan
 Getup Srinu as Kasi Reddy
 Lahari Shari as Pushkala Reddy, Kalyan's fiancée 
 Vinay Varma as Bhooma Reddy, Pushkala's father
 Naga Mahesh as Veera Reddy, Sailaja's father
 Hari Teja as Talambari, Veera Reddy's sister
 Prudhvi Raj as Aagam Reddy, Veera Reddy's henchman
 Harsha Vardhan as Pratap Reddy, Mario's father
 Mamilla Shailaja Priya as Mario's mother
 Kireeti Damaraju as Bhadram
 Annapoorna as Pushkala's grandmother
 Vitta Mahesh as Masi Reddy
 Raghu Karumanchi
 Charandeep as Bhooma Reddy's henchman
 Raghu Babu as young Prudhvi Raj (Cameo)
 Tripuraneni Chitti as Mad Scientist
 Keshav Deepak as Doctor
 Vijay Ranga Raju as Sailaja's grandfather

Production 
The film was officially announced on 8 August 2020 by releasing a motion poster of the film. The film is Prasanth's third film after Awe and Kalki. The music is composed by Mark K. Robin who is known for his works in 2019 film Agent Sai Srinivasa Athreya. The film is Sajja Teja's debut film as a lead actor.

Soundtrack 

IndiaGlitz stated about "GO Corona" single that "This song is 2020 in a nutshell. The rap draws material from some of the most popular memes of the year when the pandemic played havoc. The very title of the song is drawn from a notoriously funny slogan that a political leader gave. And there is a smattering of meme-worthy stuff like 'Aipayee', which was triggered by a spiritual sermon. Modi's call for lighting diyas and clapping for COVID warriors also gets a comical interpretation. The rap is enjoyable, while the singers immerse do their job well. Sri Krishna, Anudeep Dev, PVNS Rohit, and Hymath are the chorus singers. The female ones are Harika Narayan, Sahithi Chagunti, and Sony Komanduri."

Release and home media 
The theatrical trailer of the film was released on 2 Jan 2021, and Zombie Reddy was released on 5 Feb 2021. The digital rights of the film were acquired by aha. The satellite rights of the film were purchased by Star Maa, and premiered on 28 March 2021, and registered an average TRP rating of 9.72.

Reception

Critical response 
Sangeetha Devi Dundoo of The Hindu wrote that "In one stroke, director Prasanth Varma juxtaposes different worlds — a pandemic looming large, zombies, Rayalaseema faction rivalry — to hilarious effect. Zombie Reddy is a satirical potpourri replete with pop culture references at every turn."

Neeshita Nyayapati of The Times of India stated "Zombie Reddy does have its moments, and all the cast, including Teja, Anandhi and Daksha, seem to have fun with what they're offered. This is not a bad film by any means, if only Prasanth had not gone down the predictable route, it would've been something more." Hemanth Kumar from Firstpost gave 3 out of 5 stars and stated "Zombie Reddy is the first zombie film in Telugu cinema and to its credit, it does a fairly good job in simplifying the storytelling to the bare essentials." A review from The Hans India rated the film 3 stars of 5 and wrote: "Zombie Reddy makes a decent attempt to entertain the audiences."

Box office 

Sequel 
After the success of the film, a sequel titled Zombie Reddy: Revenge of the Dead is in development with this time the zombie virus being spread in the cities.

References

External links 
 

2021 films
Films directed by Prasanth Varma
Zombie comedy films
Indian action horror films
Films shot in Andhra Pradesh
Films set in Andhra Pradesh
2020s Telugu-language films
2021 action comedy films
2021 comedy horror films
Films about the COVID-19 pandemic
Indian zombie films